Collagen alpha-2(VI) chain is a protein that in humans is encoded by the COL6A2 gene.

Function 

This gene encodes one of the three alpha chains of type VI collagen, a beaded filament collagen found in most connective tissues. The product of this gene contains several domains similar to von Willebrand factor type A domains. These domains have been shown to bind extracellular matrix proteins, an interaction that explains the importance of this collagen in organizing matrix components. Mutations in this gene are associated with Bethlem myopathy and Ullrich scleroatonic muscular dystrophy. Three transcript variants have been identified for this gene.

References

Further reading

External links
  GeneReviews/NCBI/NIH/UW entry on Congenital Muscular Dystrophy Overview

Collagens